Count Nikolai of Monpezat (born Prince Nikolai of Denmark; born 28 August 1999) is a member of the Danish royal family. He is the eldest son of Prince Joachim and his first wife, Alexandra, Countess of Frederiksborg, and eldest grandchild of Queen Margrethe II. He is currently seventh in the line of succession to the Danish throne. At the time of his birth, he was third, after his uncle and father.

Biography
Nikolai was born a prince of Denmark at Rigshospitalet in Copenhagen on 28 August 1999. He is the oldest grandchild of Queen Margrethe II of Denmark and her late husband, Prince Henrik.

He was baptised in the chapel of the Fredensborg Palace on 6 November 1999 by the Danish Chaplain-in-Ordinary, Christian Thodberg. At the christening, the musical work Lys på din vej, composed by Frederik Magle and dedicated to the prince, was performed for the first time. His godparents are his paternal uncle, the Crown Prince of Denmark; his maternal aunt, Nicola Baird; the Earl of Wessex, Peter Steenstrup and Camilla Flint. After their divorce in 2005, Prince Joachim and Alexandra had joint custody of the prince and his brother Count Felix.

Nikolai was confirmed on 18 May 2013 in Fredensborg Palace Church in the presence of his immediate family and all his godparents.

Like his father and uncle, the prince attended Krebs School in Copenhagen. In 2014, he attended 10th grade at Herlufsholm School in Næstved and received his upper secondary education there as well. Upon leaving Herlufsholm School in August 2018, he started a two-year military program at the Royal Danish Army's  in Varde. However, he dropped out two months later as he felt a career in the military did not suit him. In July 2019, he was admitted to Copenhagen Business School to study Business Administration and Service Management.

In early 2018, Nikolai signed as a fashion model with the agency Scoop Models. He made his runway debut in February 2018 at Burberry's show at London Fashion Week. He says he sees modeling as a job rather than a career.

Titles and styles
Originally styled "His Highness Prince Nikolai of Denmark", Nikolai's style was expanded on 29 April 2008 to "His Highness Prince Nikolai of Denmark, Count of Monpezat". In September 2022, Queen Margrethe II decided to strip the children of her son Joachim from their princely status. Since 1 January 2023, Count Nikolai is known as "His Excellency Count Nikolai of Monpezat". He has said that he was "shocked and confused" to learn about the decision to strip him and his siblings of their princely title. Even with the change in titles, he and the others affected by the change maintain their places in the order of succession.

Honours
 Denmark: Recipient of the Queen Margrethe II Ruby Jubilee Medal
 Denmark: Recipient of the Queen Margrethe II Golden Jubilee Medal

References

External links
Official website

Danish princes
House of Monpezat
1999 births
Living people
People educated at Herlufsholm School
Danish people of Chinese descent
Danish people of Austrian descent
Danish people of Czech descent
Danish people of French descent
Counts of Monpezat
Danish people of British descent
Danish male models
Royalty and nobility models